The Galloway hydro-electric power scheme is a network of dams and hydro-electric power stations in Galloway, south west Scotland. It was built between 1930 and 1936.

The generating stations draw water from the River Ken, River Dee and River Doon through reservoirs at Loch Doon, Kendoon, Carsfad, Clatteringshaws, and Tongland. The unusual modernist stations were designed by Scottish civil engineer, Sir Alexander Gibb.

The scheme, which is today operated by Drax, can produce a total peak power of around 106 megawatts.

History
The scheme was authorized by the Galloway Water Power Act on 10 May 1929, by which the Galloway Water Power Company was incorporated.  Chairman of the board was former colonial administrator Lord Meston.  Also on the board was Robert Brand, managing director of the project's underwriter, Lazard Brothers and Company.

Design was carried out by civil engineers Sir Alexander Gibb  and Partners along with electrical engineer, William McLellan of Merz & McLellan. Construction began three years later in 1932 and was completed in 1936. The scheme was made viable by the recent formation of the National Grid which made generation of electricity in remote areas useful. Hydro power was particularly helpful to this grid because of its ability to be turned on and off very quickly to meet peak demands (in contrast to oil and coal stations), and to meet the natural increase during the more energy demanding winter months.

The total cost of the scheme was around three million pounds.  At a cost of £29 per kilowatt of installed capacity, they were some of the least costly stations ever built in the UK.

The scheme was extended in 1984 with the addition of the Drumjohn power station which made use of the existing needle valve where the water from Loch Doon and the Deuch feed into the Dee. This station has a capacity of just 2.3 megawatts, but was constructed largely using existing infrastructure.

In 2018 Drax Group purchased the scheme, alongside a number of other assets, from then owners Scottish Power.

Architecture

The stations are generally white, Modernist structures, highly glazed and with large airy turbine halls. The designs were stylistically advanced for their time and can be viewed as some of Scotland's earliest modern buildings. The credit for the design is given to Alexander Gibb and Partners, however it seems likely that the design received input from H. O. Tarbolton, the architectural advisor to the scheme's "Amenities Committee". This committee was set up to "make to the Company such recommendations as they may think are reasonable and proper for the preservation of the beauty of the scenery" (from the 1929 Galloway water power act). Tarbolton was designer of the Pitlochry power station which bears some striking similarities to the Galloway turbine halls. Whilst no direct credit for the design work can be given to him, it is unlikely that he had no influence on the outcome.

In their book Power from water (1960), two partners of Alexander Gibb and Partners, A.O.L. Paton, and J Guthrie Brown (the latter of whom is known to have worked on the Galloway scheme), write that "The architecture of the power stations, under the watchful eye of the amenity committee...was given the most careful attention."

Parts of the scheme are now listed buildings, specifically the Glenlee Power Station and Bridge and the Tongland Power Station, Surge Tower and Valve House.

In great contrast to the bright pristine nature of the stations, the dams are organic and entwined with the natural rock. They are generally arch dams, curved in plan, bearing onto the side walls of the valleys except in those dams where only one side of the valley is suitable for bearing. In these latter cases, the end of the dam straightens out, and the last section of gravity dam (where the weight of the dam itself resists the force of the water) then acts like a buttress to the more efficient arch dam.

Perceptions of the scheme
Today the dams are well liked and a source of pride to the people of Galloway and of course are still generating environmentally friendly electricity. However they were not universally admired when they were first built, as local poet W.G.M. Dobie wrote:

A raider comes today who kills
The glories of our glens and hills
With unheroic acts and bills
and "Private Legislation"
The Company promoters pen
Will Dam the Deugh and dam the Ken
and Dam the Dee - oh Dam the men
Who Plan such desecration!

Generating stations
The six generating stations, from north to south, are:

References

Notes

Sources
 Hill, George (1984). Tunnel and Dam: The Story of the Galloway Hydros. South of Scotland Electricity Board.

External links

Visit Tongland Power Station - Drax Power
Power From Scotland's Lochs An account of the Galloway Scheme from 1937

Hydroelectric power stations in Scotland
Buildings and structures in Dumfries and Galloway
Economy of Dumfries and Galloway
Galloway
1930s establishments in Scotland
Category A listed buildings in Dumfries and Galloway